Sanqiao Township is a rural township in Jingzhou Miao and Dong Autonomous County, Hunan, China. Among them, the Miao and Dong people account for 99% of the total population.

Administrative division
As of 2017, the township is divided into 8 villages: Fengxiang, Caidi, Dimiao, Yuanzhen, Fengchong, Xiaoliu, Disun, and Nanshan.

Geography
Mountains located adjacent to and visible from the townsite are: Mount Jiulong, Mount Fengmu and Mount Pengpojie.

The Guangping River passes through the town south to north.

Economy
The economy is supported primarily by farming and ranching. Gastrodia elata is a major cash crop.

Culture
The Miao folk songs and tea songs are the main music in this area.

References

Townships of Huaihua
Jingzhou Miao and Dong Autonomous County